Passage Brady is one of two iron-and-glass covered arcades (known in French as the Passages couverts de Paris) located in the 10th arrondissement of Paris, France constructed in 1828. It lies between Rue du Faubourg-Saint-Denis and Rue du Faubourg-Saint-Martin.

It is famous for the several Indian, Pakistani and Bangladeshi restaurants located in the arcade.

Buildings and structures in the 10th arrondissement of Paris
Covered passages of Paris
Shopping malls established in 1828